The 2018 Oakland mayoral election was held on November 6, 2018 to elect the mayor of Oakland, California. Incumbent mayor Libby Schaaf was reelected. The election was held using instant-runoff voting, but Schaaf received a majority of votes in the first round, so no additional rounds were necessary.

Municipal elections in California are officially non-partisan.

Results

References 

Oakland
Mayoral elections in Oakland, California
Oakland